The second cabinet of Alexandru Averescu was the government of Romania from 13 March 1920 to 16 December 1921.

Ministers
The ministers of the cabinet were as follows:

President of the Council of Ministers:
Gen. Alexandru Averescu (13 March 1920 - 16 December 1921)
Minister of the Interior: 
Gen. Alexandru Averescu (13 March - 13 June 1920)
Constantin Argetoianu (13 June 1920 - 16 December 1921)
Minister of Foreign Affairs: 
Duiliu Zamfirescu (13 March - 13 June 1920)
Take Ionescu (13 June 1920 - 16 December 1921)
Minister of Finance:
Constantin Argetoianu (13 March - 13 June 1920)
Nicolae Titulescu (13 June 1920 - 16 December 1921)
Minister of Justice:
(interim) Constantin Argetoianu (13 - 30 March 1920)
Matei Cantacuzino (30 March - 27 August 1920)
(interim) Dimitrie Greceanu (27 August - 16 November 1920)
Dimitrie Greceanu (16 November 1920 - 1 January 1921)
Mihai Antonescu (1 January - 16 December 1921)
Minister of War:
Gen. Ioan Rășcanu (13 March 1920 - 16 December 1921)
Minister of Public Works:
Gen. Gheorghe Văleanu (13 March - 13 June 1920)
Dimitrie Greceanu (13 June - 16 November 1920)
Octavian Tăslăuanu (16 November 1920 - 1 January 1921)
Ion Petrovici (1 January - 16 December 1921)
Minister of Communications:
Gen. Gheorghe Văleanu (13 June 1920 - 16 December 1921)
Minister of Industry and Commerce:
Octavian Tăslăuanu (13 March - 16 November 1920)
Gen. Alexandru Averescu (16 November 1920 - 16 December 1921)
(interim) Fotin Enescu (19 February - 4 March 1918)
Minister of Religious Affairs and Public Instruction:
Petre P. Negulescu (13 March - 13 June 1920)
Minister of Public Instruction:
Petre P. Negulescu (13 June 1920 - 16 December 1921)
Minister of Religious Affairs and the Arts:
Octavian Goga (13 June 1920 - 16 December 1921)
Minister of Agriculture and Property:
Theodor Cudalbu (13 March 1920 - 18 July 1921)
Minister of Agriculture:
Constantin Garoflid (22 July - 16 December 1921)
Minister of Property:
Theodor Cudalbu (18 July - 16 December 1921)
Minister of Labour and Social Security:
Grigore Trancu-Iași (30 March 1920 - 16 December 1921)

Minister of State (Ministers without portfolio):
Anton Mocsony (13 March - 1 November 1920)
Ion Inculeț (13 March - 2 May 1920)
Ion Nistor (13 March - 2 May 1920)
Grigore Trancu-Iași (13 - 30 March 1920)
Vasile Goldiș (18 - 19 March 1920), commissioned to oversee Transylvania
Octavian Goga (18 March - 13 June 1920)
Constantin Garoflid (3 April 1920 - 22 July 1921)
Sergiu Niță (2 May 1920 - 16 December 1921)
Ion V. Stârcea (2 May - 1 November 1920)
Petru Groza (16 April - 16 December 1921)
Dori Popovici (16 April - 16 December 1921)

References

Cabinets of Romania
Cabinets established in 1920
Cabinets disestablished in 1921
1920 establishments in Romania
1921 disestablishments in Romania